Mifflin County Courthouse is a historic courthouse building located at Lewistown, Mifflin County, Pennsylvania.  It was built in 1842–1843, and is a 2 1/2-story, brick building in the Greek Revival style.  It is three-bays wide and the original building measured 48 feet by 82 feet. It was enlarged by 48 feet to the rear in 1878.  It features a pedimented entryway with two engaged pilasters and prominent cupola.

The building was added to the National Register of Historic Places in 1976.

The courthouse has been updated and restored, with the second floor courtroom restored to a late 19th-century appearance. The building features large art works of local significance, and hosts the offices of the Mifflin County Historical Society, the area chamber of commerce and Downtown Lewistown, Inc.

See also
 List of state and county courthouses in Pennsylvania

References

Courthouses on the National Register of Historic Places in Pennsylvania
Greek Revival architecture in Pennsylvania
Government buildings completed in 1843
Buildings and structures in Mifflin County, Pennsylvania
Tourist attractions in Mifflin County, Pennsylvania
1843 establishments in Pennsylvania
National Register of Historic Places in Mifflin County, Pennsylvania